Brave Miss World is an 2013 American-Israeli documentary film, directed and produced by Cecilia Peck. It follows Linor Abargil an Israeli beauty queen who won the title of Miss World beauty pageant in 1998, after being assaulted just weeks prior, as she spreads global awareness around sexual assault. Sharon Stone served as a co-executive producer on the film.

It had its world premiere at the Dallas International Film Festival on April 10, 2013. It had a theatrical release on November 15, 2013, followed by digital streaming on Netflix on May 29, 2014.

Synopsis
In 1998, Linor Abargil won the title of Miss World, a beauty pageant after being sexually assaulted weeks prior. Abargil raises global awareness around sexual assault. Joan Collins and Fran Drescher also appear in the film.

Cast
 Linor Abargil
 Alison Botha
 Joan Collins
 Fran Drescher

Production
Linor Abargil began meeting with directors to encourage victims of sexual assault to speak out, seek help, and seek justice, and began meeting with film directors in Los Angeles, and met with Cecilia Peck, after seeing her previous film Dixie Chicks: Shut Up and Sing. Abargil always wanted to make a documentary in order for people not to feel alone and to reach more people than she could in person, taking her 10 years to gain the courage. The film was shot over the course of five years, as Abargil traveled the world giving speeches and meeting with victims of assault. Peck initially thought the film would be a quick shoot, but production paused several times in order to raise additional money, and the process was difficult for Abargil, also upon discovering her assaulter had been furloughed. In attempt to raise more money, the crew edited a trailer and launched an Indiegogo campaign, apart from asking friends and family for donations, before eventually securing the funds to continue production. Sharon Stone serves as a co-executive producer on the film.

Release
The film had its world premiere at the Dallas International Film Festival on April 10, 2013. It also screened at the AFI Docs Film Festival on June 21, 2013. The film was released in a limited release on November 15, 2013, as part of an awards qualifying run for the Academy Awards. Shortly after, Netflix acquired distribution rights to the film and released it on May 29, 2014.

Impact
The producers of the film launched a website bravemissworld.com to share their stories of assault and to keep up with Abargil as she continues to raise awareness having over 10 million visitors on the website. The film also screens on college campuses across the United States to continue to raise awareness of sexual assault.

References

External links
 
 

2013 films
American documentary films
Israeli documentary films
2013 documentary films
Documentary films about violence against women
Films about beauty queens
2010s English-language films
2010s Hebrew-language films
Films about rape
Sexual abuse victims advocacy
Rape in the United States
Netflix original documentary films
Films scored by Hans Zimmer
2013 multilingual films
American multilingual films
Israeli multilingual films
2010s American films